The 2016 FC Atyrau season is the 16th successive season that the club will play in the Kazakhstan Premier League, the highest tier of association football in Kazakhstan.

Squad

Reserve team

Transfers

Winter

In:

Out:

Summer

In:

Out:

Friendlies

Competitions

Kazakhstan Premier League

Regular season

Results summary

Results by round

Results

League table

Relegation round

Results summary

Results by round

Results

League table

Kazakhstan Cup

Squad statistics

Appearances and goals

|-
|colspan="14"|Players away from Atyrau on loan:
|-
|colspan="14"|Players who appeared for Atyrau that left during the season:
|}

Goal scorers

Disciplinary record

References

External links
 Official website
 Official VK

FC Atyrau seasons
Atyrau